Sighetu Marmației (also spelled Sighetul Marmației;  or Siget; , ;), until 1960 Sighet, is a city (municipality) in Maramureș County near the Iza River, in northwestern Romania.

Geography
Sighetu Marmației is situated along the Tisa river on the border with Ukraine, across from the Ukrainian town of Solotvyno.
Neighboring communities include: Sarasău, Săpânța, Câmpulung la Tisa, Ocna Șugatag, Giulești, Vadu Izei, Rona de Jos and Bocicoiu Mare communities in Romania, Bila Cerkva community and the Solotvyno township in Ukraine (Zakarpattia Oblast). The city administers five villages: Iapa (Kabolapatak), Lazu Baciului (Bácsiláz), Șugău (Sugó), Valea Cufundoasă (Mélypatak) and Valea Hotarului (Határvölgy).

Demographics

The city has 37,640 inhabitants.
Romanians - 82.2%
Hungarians - 13%
Ukrainians - 2.3%
Roma - 1.5%

According to the 1910 census, the city had 21,370 inhabitants; these consisted of 17,542 (82.1%) Hungarian speakers, 2,002 (9.4%) Romanian, 1,257 (5.9%) German, and 32 Ruthenian speakers.
The number of Jews was 7,981; they were included in the Hungarian and German language groups. There were
5,850 Greek Catholics and 4,901 Roman Catholics. According to a 1920 estimate, the city had 23,691 inhabitants, 11,026 being Jews, 6,552 Hungarians and 4,964 Romanians, 149 Germans and 1,000 of other ethnicities. The 1930 census numbered 27,270 inhabitants, 10,526 of them being Jews, 9,658 Romanians, 5,424 Hungarians, 1,221 Ukrainians and 441 of other ethnicities.

Etymology 
The municipality's name derives from Hungarian name which means "island in Máramaros". According to the legend, the place name comes from the Hungarian expression "mára már rossz" (too bad by now), referring to that the local tribes moved to Moldavia.

Inhabitants simply call to the city Sighet and similar abbreviations in their mother tongue.

History
Inhabited since the Hallstatt period, the populated area  lies in the Tisza Valley, an important route as being the only access to the otherwise mountainous, sparsely populated region. After 895 in the 10th century the area became part of Kingdom of Hungary. The first mention of a settlement dates back to the 11th century, and the city as such was first mentioned in 1326. In 1352, it was a free royal town and the capital of Máramaros comitatus, just outside Transylvania.

After the defeat at the Battle of Mohács and the death of Louis II of Hungary, in the ensuing struggle for the Hungarian throne, the kingdom was divided into Royal Hungary of Habsburg Ferdinand I, Holy Roman Emperor and the Eastern Hungarian Kingdom of John Zápolya the Voivode of Transylvania. In 1570 the Principality of Transylvania was formed which included Máramaros County. Transylvania, including Maramureș, became an autonomous principality within the Ottoman Empire from 1541. In 1711, King Charles III returned Máramaros County to his Hungarian domain.

1918 saw the dissolution of the Austro-Hungarian Monarchy. On November 22, 1918, in an assembly of Romanians from Maramureș took place in the town's central square, electing a national council and deciding to send a delegation to the Great National Assembly of Alba Iulia, which voted the union of Transylvania with Romania and the consequent establishment of Greater Romania. The Allied Powers accepted the Romanian demands and Transylvania including Máramaros County was formally ceded to Romania in the Treaty of Trianon in 1920.

In 1919, six Romanian schools opened in Sighet: a boys' high school, a girls' high school, a boys' elementary school, a co-ed commercial gymnasium, and two commercial high schools (one for boys, the other for girls). The Maramureș ethnographic museum opened in the cultural palace in 1926. During the interwar period, over twenty newspapers appeared in the town, as well as a number of literary reviews. As a result of the August 1940 Second Vienna Award during World War II, it came under Hungarian administration during the war.

A first deportation of Jews from Sighet took place in 1941. The second occurred after Passover 1944, so that by April, the town's ghetto contained close to 13,000 Jews from Sighet itself and the neighboring places of Dragomirești, Ocna Șugatag and Vișeu de Sus. Between May 16 and 22, the ghetto was liquidated in four transports, its inhabitants sent to Auschwitz concentration camp. Among the deportees was Sighet native and future Nobel Peace Prize laureate Elie Wiesel. In 1947, there were some 2,300 Jews in Sighet, including survivors and a considerable number of Jews from other parts of Romania. By 2002, the town had 20 remaining Jews.

The Treaty of Paris at the end of World War II voided the Vienna Awards, and Sighetu Marmației, administered by Romania since October 1944, formally returned to the country in 1947.

In 1948, the new Communist regime nationalized the city's factories, three publishing houses and banks. In 1950, with the counties replaced by regions, Sighet lost its status as an administrative center. In 1960, the building of neighborhoods with apartment blocks began. The same year, the town’s name became Sighetul Marmației; the final “l” was dropped in 1968. 1962 saw the opening of a wood processing factory (Combinatul de Industrializare a Lemnului). Turning out furniture and other wood products, it had over 6,000 employees and played an important part in the city's economic development. After the Romanian Revolution of 1989, it gradually fell upon hard times, with nine private firms employing some 3500 in 2012. A second important employer during the Communist period was a textile factory.

In May 2014 a commemoration was held in honour of the 70th anniversary of the deportations in May 1944. Events included a Klezmer concert, Sabbath services in the one remaining synagogue, a memorial service at the Holocaust Monument at the site of the deportations, as well as an exhibit on life in Sighet prior to the deportations. The exhibit contained contributions by survivors and their families. Additionally, visits were organized to the Jewish Cemetery as well as the Holocaust Museum located in the childhood home of Elie Wiesel. On 3 August 2018, Wiesel's birthplace was vandalized.

Sighet prison 

After the establishment of the Romanian communist regime, the Securitate ran the Sighet Prison during the 1950s and 1960s as a place for the detention and political repression of public figures who had been declared "class enemies." The most prominent of these was the former prime minister Iuliu Maniu, who died in the prison in 1953. The former prison is operated as a museum, part of the Memorial of the Victims of Communism and of the Resistance.

International relations

Twin towns — Sister cities
Sighetu Marmației is twinned with:
  Khust, Ukraine
  Oława, Poland
  Kolomyia, Ukraine
 Naples, Italy
 Kiryat Yam, Israel

Notable inhabitants
 Marius Bilașco
 Dumitru Cernicica
 Géza Frid
 Hédi Fried
John Gassner, Yale University professor
 Zoltan Harmat (1900-1985), Israeli architect
 Simon Hollósy
 Monica Iagăr
 Alexandru Ivasiuc
 György Jakubinyi
 Hermann Kahan
 Amos Manor
 Gisella Perl
 Kornélia Prielle
 Edmund Bordeaux Szekely
 Joel Teitelbaum
 Moshe Teitelbaum
 Yekusiel Yehuda Teitelbaum (II)
 Simon Ungar
 Elie Wiesel

See also
 Night

Image gallery

References

External links

 Photos and Images of Sighetu Marmației
 Photos of Sighetu Marmației
 Sighetu Marmației
 Sighetu Marmației
 Sighetu Marmației Online News
 The Sighet Memorial of the Victims of Communism

 
Populated places in Maramureș County
Cities in Romania
Localities in Romanian Maramureș
Satmar (Hasidic dynasty)
Romania–Ukraine border crossings
Place names of Hungarian origin in Romania
Shtetls
Capitals of former Romanian counties
Holocaust locations in Romania